Guillem de Cabestany (1162–1212) was a Catalan troubadour from Cabestany in the County of Roussillon. He is often known by his Old Occitan name, Guilhem de Cabestaing, Cabestang, Cabestan, or Cabestanh (pronounced ).

Life 
Not much reliable information is known about Guillem de Cabestany. He is probably the son of Arnau de Cabestany, a noble of Roussillon, and a vassal in relation with the lords of Castell Rosselló. Cabestany itself is a fief located immediately next to the east of Castell Rosselló and southwest of Canet (a future viscounty).

According to Pere Tomich, Guillem de Cabestany fought alongside Peter II of Aragon at the Battle of Las Navas de Tolosa against  the Almohads in 1212.

Legend 
According to his legendary vida, he was the lover of Margarida or Seremonda (or Soremonda), wife of Raimon of Castell Rosselló. On discovering their affair, Raimon fed Cabestany's heart to Seremonda. When he told her what she had eaten, she threw herself from the window to her death.

The vida precedes Cabestany's poem Lo dous cossire in his Chansonnier I. It is translated alongside the Old Occitan in Margarita Egan's 1984 edition The vidas of the troubadours.

Versions of this legend appear later in Giovanni Boccaccio's Decameron (1348–53), Stendhal's On Love (1822), and in Ezra Pound's Canto IV (1924–25). It also inspired the opera Written on Skin (2012) by George Benjamin and Martin Crimp.

Seremonda is thought to have been married two or three times, first to Raimon of Castell Rosselló, to another husband in 1210, and then to Aymar de Mosset. De Mosset probably fought alongside Cabestany in the Battle of Las Navas de Tolosa in 1212. Raimon himself lived peacefully in Castell Rosselló until at least 1218.

Medievalist John E. Matzke has identified at least fourteen different versions of the "eaten heart" legend in several different literary traditions. Cabestany's vida may not be the earliest version.

With reference to regional historian Jules Canonge, Cabestany is presented as the archetypal troubador in Ford Madox Ford's book Provence.

Known works

Some of Cabestany's poems were published along with his vida by François-Juste-Marie Raynouard in 1816.

All of Cabestany's works have been published by Michel Adroher in side-by-side Old Occitan and Modern French. Nine extant songs are attributed to Cabestany, of which two are uncertain.

Sources

External links
 Cabestany's entry in the Bibliothèque nationale de France catalogue

Notes

Poets from Catalonia
12th-century Spanish troubadours
1162 births
1212 deaths
12th-century Catalan people